George Patterson (November 26, 1939 – December 22, 2003) was an American basketball player who played in the National Basketball Association. Patterson was originally drafted in the twelfth round of the 1961 NBA draft by the Cincinnati Royals. He would finally play in the NBA with the Detroit Pistons from 1967 to 1968. Later, he was selected by the Milwaukee Bucks in the 1968 NBA Expansion Draft.

He attended high school in Pittsburgh, Pennsylvania.

George Patterson was the grandfather of Shea Patterson, quarterback of the University of Michigan football team.

References

1939 births
2003 deaths
American men's basketball players
Basketball players from Pittsburgh
Centers (basketball)
Chicago Majors players
Cincinnati Royals draft picks
Detroit Pistons players
Kansas City Steers players
Toledo Rockets men's basketball players
Central Catholic High School (Pittsburgh) alumni